Cascate del Rio Verde, located in Borrello are the highest natural waterfalls in the   Italian  Apennines. 

Cascate del Rio Verde consists of three jumps for a total of over 200 meters. The panorama is made up of rocks, made up of calcarenites and marls resting on clay.

References 

Waterfalls of Abruzzo